

Govt. High School (GHS) is a public school, located in Bangra Manjeshwar, Kasaragod District, Kerala State of India. This high school is affiliated to the Kerala State Education Board. This High School is listed as one of the SSLC examination centres  by the Kerala Education Board. This school is one of the very few schools in Kerala that teaches in  Kannada Language (the language spoken predominantly in the neighbour state Karnataka) instead of Malayalam Language (the language spoken predominantly in the state of Kerala).

History
One of the oldest high school in Manjeshwaram providing free education from 5th to 10th Grade. This school was formerly known as Military High School of Manjeshwaram.

See also
Education in India
Kerala State Education Board
Kerala
Manjeshwaram

References

Schools in Kasaragod district
High schools and secondary schools in Kerala